James J. Davidson (November 5, 1861 – January 2, 1897) was an American politician and businessman.

Born in Connellsville, Pennsylvania, Davidson moved with his family to Beaver County, Pennsylvania. In 1878, Davidson went to school in Beaver, Pennsylvania, then went to Bethany College, in Bethany, West Virginia and then graduated from University of Kentucky in 1883. He then returned to Beaver, Pennsylvania to study law. Then, in 1885, he worked for Darragh, Watson & Company who produced oil. Davidson became president of Union Drawn Steel Works. In 1896, Davidson was elected to the United States House of Representatives as a Republican. However, he traveled to Colorado and Utah to try to improve his ill health. In 1897, Davidson died in Phoenix, Arizona Territory as a result of his ill health and before the March 4, 1897 beginning of his term.

See also
List of members-elect of the United States House of Representatives who never took their seats

Notes

1861 births
1897 deaths
19th-century American businesspeople
Bethany College (West Virginia) alumni
Businesspeople from Pennsylvania
Elected officials who died without taking their seats
People from Connellsville, Pennsylvania
Pennsylvania Republicans
University of Kentucky alumni